The 1951 Summer International University Sports Week were organised by the International University Sports Federation (FISU) and held in Luxembourg, Luxembourg, between 19 and 26 August.

Sports
  Athletics
  Basketball
  Cycling
  Fencing
  Field hockey
  Football
  Swimming
  Tennis
  Volleyball

Participating nations

References

 
1951
S
S
Summer International University Sports Week
Multi-sport events in Luxembourg
Summer International University Sports Week